Edith Vethi Nyenze is a Kamba  Kenyan politician who is the incumbent Member of Parliament for Kitui West Constituency. She was elected to succeed her late husband Francis Nyenze as the 7th Member of Parliament for Kitui West Constituency. She belongs to the WDM.

Kitui West By-election 

Following the death of her husband in December 2017, Edith declared her intention to plunk into the elective politics. She entered in the race to succeed him as Member of Parliament for Kitui West Constituency in the subsequent by-election on 26 March 2018; and participated in the WDM party primary election process emerging the winner. She beat Maluki Mwendwa son to Winnie Nyiva Mwendwa.

On 26 March 2018 she won the seat on a landslide victory, garnering 72% of the total votes casts. The by-election voter turnout was said to be 38%.

References

1960 births
Living people
Wiper Democratic Movement – Kenya politicians
People from Kitui County
Kamba people
21st-century Kenyan women politicians
21st-century Kenyan politicians
Members of the National Assembly (Kenya)
Members of the 12th Parliament of Kenya
Members of the 13th Parliament of Kenya